The Woodlands School is a movement in Anishinaabe art. See Woodlands style.

There is a number of schools called Woodlands School or have similar names:

 The Woodlands School (Mississauga), Ontario, Canada
 The Woodlands College Park High School, Montgomery County, Texas, USA
 The Woodlands High School, Texas, USA
 Woodlands Ring Secondary School, Singapore
 Woodlands School, Aberdeen, Scotland
 The Woodlands School, Coventry, England
 Woodlands School, Basildon, Essex, England
 Allestree Woodlands School, Derby, England
 St Peter's Woodlands Grammar School, Adelaide, South Australia

See also
 The Woodlands (disambiguation)
 Woodlands (disambiguation)
 Woodland (disambiguation)